The 1990–91 Northern Football League season was the 93rd in the history of Northern Football League, a football competition in England.

Division One

Division One featured 17 clubs which competed in the division last season, along with three new clubs, promoted from Division Two:
 Murton
 Northallerton Town
 Peterlee Newtown

League table

Division Two

Division Two featured 17 clubs which competed in the division last season, along with two new clubs, relegated from Division One:
 Billingham Town
 Easington Colliery

League table

References

External links
 Northern Football League official site

Northern Football League seasons
1990–91 in English football leagues